Protomallocera hilairei is a species of beetle in the family Cerambycidae, the only species in the genus Protomallocera.

References

Elaphidiini